The 1988 Raleigh tornado was the most destructive of the seven tornadoes reported in northeastern North Carolina and southeastern Virginia on November 28, 1988, between 1:00 AM and 5:45 AM. The Raleigh tornado produced over $77 million in damage, along with four fatalities (two in the city of Raleigh, and two in Nash County) and 154 injuries.

Synopsis 
A surface-level pressure trough was located east of the Appalachian mountains and extended from Maryland to Georgia. A warm front previously located in the coastal plains had moved into the piedmont, separating air with temperatures and dew points in the 50s to the northwest from southeastern air with temperatures in the 70s and dew points in the 60s. A large upper level progressive amplitude trough stretched from the Great Lakes to the Mississippi Gulf Coast, and an also large amplitude ridge was situated over the western Atlantic with an axis extending from Bermuda to the Canadian Maritimes. A subtropical jetstream axis extended from the Gulf of Mexico to the Savannah River Basin. A polar jet stream was located over the Ohio River valley. Positive buoyant energy was estimated at 1200 j/kg over the Raleigh area 

All that weekend, the Storm Prediction Center was watching the eastern half of the United States for possibility for severe weather, according to WRAL-TV.

Confirmed tornadoes

Sources:

Raleigh, North Carolina

Rated at F4 strength on Fujita scale, the Raleigh tornado touched down shortly after 1:00 AM on Monday, November 28 in Umstead State Park, between the western city limits of Raleigh and Raleigh-Durham International Airport. It was spawned by a high-precipitation supercell that formed east of Charlotte in the southern Piedmont region and began to exhibit severe and rotational characteristics as it crossed nearby Chatham County; earlier in the afternoon and evening, strong thunderstorms had been noted in the Charlotte area and also in the mountainous northwest corner of North Carolina. However, at 1:00 AM no severe thunderstorm or tornado watch had been issued for Raleigh and Wake County, North Carolina. The weather conditions were believed to not be conducive to the development of such storms. Also, according to a Raleigh News & Observer article on the 25th anniversary of the storm, Joseph M. Pelissier, deputy meteorologist at the National Weather Service office at RDU Airport, stated that the tornado formed almost directly above the airport where there was a blind spot in the radar system.

Warnings were quickly issued as the storm began carving a path through suburban north Raleigh, damaging or destroying nearly 2500 residences and over 75 businesses including entire shopping centers. By 1:30 AM, the tornado had moved out of northern Wake County and into Franklin County, North Carolina. Fluctuating between F1 and F3 in strength, the storm finally dissipated after crossing I-95 between Roanoke Rapids and the Virginia state line. Overall, four people were killed: 2 children in Raleigh, 9-year-old Janet Barnes and 12-year-old Pete Fulghum, and a couple in their mobile home in Nash County. The tornado was responsible for destroying 425 residences and 78 businesses, including a K-Mart. Over 157 people were injured as a result of the storms.

Additional tornadoes
Shortly after the Raleigh tornado formed, a second supercell produced a weak (F1) tornado near Alberta, Virginia and I-85.

After the Raleigh tornado dissipated, the parent supercell spawned a weaker second tornado (F2) that caused minor damage in a brief touchdown near Seaboard, North Carolina. The storm then spawned a third (also F2) tornado that produced $500,000 in damage in Southampton County, Virginia, Isle Of Wight County, Virginia, and the City of Franklin, Virginia.

Meanwhile, a third supercell later produced weak (F0 and F1) tornadoes in Pamlico County, North Carolina, Hyde County, North Carolina, and the Manteo area on Roanoke Island in Dare County, North Carolina.

See also
List of North American tornadoes and tornado outbreaks

References

Jarvis, C. (1988, November 29). Recovering from surprise tornadoes. United Press International
Thompson, M. S. (1988, November 29) Twisters Rip N. Carolina; 4 Killed, Scores Injured; First Storm Struck Area With No Warning. Washington Post, p. A3.
Jarvis, C. (1988, November 30). Tornado had winds up to 200 mph. United Press International

External links
News coverage from WRAL-TV, 11/28/88

F4 tornadoes by date
Raleigh,1988-11-28
Tornadoes of 1988
Tornadoes in North Carolina
Raleigh Tornado Outbreak, 1988
20th century in Raleigh, North Carolina
1988 in Virginia
Raleigh Tornado Outbreak